Shreyas Ketkar (born 1 November 2003) is an Indian professional footballer who plays as a central midfielder for Bengaluru B.

Career

Shreyas Ketkar made his first professional appearance for Indian Arrows on 10 January 2021 against Churchill Brothers.

Career statistics

Club

References

2003 births
Living people
Footballers from Bangalore
Indian footballers
Indian Arrows players
I-League players
Association football midfielders